, released on July 16, 2008, is Tōhōshinki's 23rd Japanese single. Approximately two months prior to the official release of the song, a leak of the recording grossed many hits on the internet.

On July 22, 2008, Tohoshinki became the first non-Japanese Asian artist to have three number one hits on the weekly Oricon singles chart, when their single "Dōshite Kimi o Suki ni Natte Shimattandarō?" attained the number one position with weekly sales of 68,417 copies. After Tohoshinki's invitation and performance in the prestigious Japanese year-end music festival, Kōhaku Uta Gassen, the group saw a surge in sales yet again in 2009 as well as interest in the music video on online streaming sites from Japanese viewers.

Music video

Two music videos were created, one featuring TVXQ group members while the other features a story. The drama version was released on June 24, 2008. According to management, the drama version was made especially for viewers who were not necessarily fans of the group and wanted to simply appreciate the song and its meaning.

The drama version feature Mina Fujii and Kouki Murakami. Kouki's character falls in love with Mina's character, but she gets married before he could confess his feelings.

Track list

Release history

Charts

Oricon sales chart (Japan)

References

2008 singles
TVXQ songs
Oricon Weekly number-one singles
2008 songs
Avex Trax singles
Rhythm Zone singles